Gonzalo Ezequiel González (born 6 March 1995) is an Argentine professional footballer who plays as a forward for Primera B Metropolitana side Acassuso.

Career
González ascended through the youth ranks of Argentine Primera División club Arsenal Sarandí. He made his professional debut with the first team on 10 July 2015, coming on during the final minutes of a 1–0 defeat against Gimnasia LP. His only other appearance with the club was in a Copa Sudamericana fixture two months later. He completed his transfer to Primera D side El Porvenir in time for the 2016 season. That year, González scored five goals in eleven matches as he led his team to a first-place league finish and promotion to Primera C.

He joined Primera B Metropolitana side Acassuso in July 2016. His debut for the club came on 27 August in a 1–0 defeat to Comunicaciones. He scored his first professional goal in his sixth match, a 1–1 draw with Platense on 30 October. It came two minutes after being subbed into the game.

Honours
El Porvenir
 Primera D (1): 2016

Career statistics
.

References

External links
 

Living people
1995 births
Argentine footballers
Association football forwards
Arsenal de Sarandí footballers
Club Atlético Acassuso footballers
Argentine Primera División players
Primera D Metropolitana players
Primera B Metropolitana players
People from Quilmes
Sportspeople from Buenos Aires Province